The Last Waltz is a 1953 West German musical romance film directed by Arthur Maria Rabenalt, and starring Eva Bartok, Curd Jürgens, and O. E. Hasse. It is an operetta film, based on the 1920 work The Last Waltz by Oscar Straus. It was one of several film adaptations of the operetta. It was shot partly at the Wiesbaden Studios in Hesse and on location in the Rhineland. The film's sets were designed by the art director Max Mellin.

Cast

See also 
The Last Waltz (1927)
The Last Waltz (1934)
The Last Waltz (UK, 1936)
The Last Waltz (France, 1936)

References

External links 

1950s romantic musical films
German romantic musical films
West German films
Films directed by Arthur Maria Rabenalt
Films based on operettas
Operetta films
Remakes of German films
German black-and-white films
1950s German films